Viekšniai ( Samogitian: Vėikšnē,  Vekshne) is a city in the Mažeikiai district municipality, Lithuania.

Notable people
 Mykolas Biržiška

External links

 

 
Cities in Lithuania
Cities in Telšiai County
Mažeikiai District Municipality
Shavelsky Uyezd